Monroe Curtis Beardsley (December 10, 1915 – September 18, 1985) was an American philosopher of art.

Biography
Beardsley was born and raised in Bridgeport, Connecticut, and educated at Yale University (B.A. 1936, Ph.D. 1939), where he received the John Addison Porter Prize. He taught at a number of colleges and universities, including Mount Holyoke College and Yale University, but most of his career was spent at Swarthmore College (22 years) and Temple University (16 years). His wife and occasional coauthor, Elizabeth Lane Beardsley, was also a philosopher at Temple.

His work in aesthetics is best known for its championing of the instrumentalist theory of art and the concept of aesthetic experience. Beardsley was elected president of the American Society for Aesthetics in 1956. Among literary critics, Beardsley is known for two essays written with W.K. Wimsatt, "The Intentional Fallacy" and "The Affective Fallacy," both key texts of New Criticism.  His books include: Practical Logic (1950), Aesthetics (1958) (an introductory text), and Aesthetics: A Short History (1966). He also edited a well-regarded survey anthology of philosophy, The European Philosophers from Descartes to Nietzsche.  He was elected a Fellow of the American Academy of Arts and Sciences in 1976.

He and his wife were over-all series editors for Prentice-Hall's "Foundations of Philosophy," a series of textbooks on different fields within philosophy, written in most cases by leading scholars in those fields.

See also
American philosophy
List of American philosophers

References

External links
 
 Monroe C. Beardsley, "Postscript 1980-: Some Old Problems in New Perspectives," in Aesthetics: Problems in the Philosophy of Criticism, 1st ed., 1958; 2d ed., 1981.
 American National Biography Online: Beardsley, Monroe C.

1915 births
1985 deaths
20th-century American philosophers
Fellows of the American Academy of Arts and Sciences
American literary critics
Mount Holyoke College faculty
New Criticism
Writers from Bridgeport, Connecticut
Philosophers of art
Swarthmore College faculty
Temple University faculty
Yale University alumni
Yale University faculty
20th-century American non-fiction writers
Philosophers from Connecticut
Philosophers from New Jersey
Philosophers from Massachusetts